Luguru is a Bantu language spoken by the Luguru people of the Morogoro region and the Pwani region of Tanzania. The name is also spelled Lughuru, Lugulu, Ruguru. It is closely related to Gogo and Zaramo, but is not intelligible with other languages.

References 

Languages of Tanzania
Northeast Coast Bantu languages